Cicognini is a surname. Notable people with the surname include:

 Alessandro Cicognini, (1906–1995) Italian film composer
 Giacinto Andrea Cicognini, (1606–1651) Italian playwright
 Jeanine Cicognini (born 1986), Swiss badminton player

See also
 Cicognini National Boarding School, boarding school in Prato, Italy